The ″Manifesto to the Europeans″ (German: Aufruf an die Europäer) was a pacifistic proclamation written in response to the Manifesto of the Ninety-Three that included as its authors, German astronomer, Wilhelm Julius Foerster, and German physiologist, Georg Friedrich Nicolai. Foerster soon regretted signing the ″Manifesto of the Ninety-Three″ and with Nicolai drew up the ″Manifesto to the Europeans″ as an intellectual atonement, one which expressed hope that Europe's sense of a common culture could bring an end to the calamitous First World War. While a number of intellectuals of the period were sympathetic to the contents of the document, aside from the authors, only renowned German-born physicist Albert Einstein and German philosopher Otto Buek signed it.

History
Following the October 1914 publication of the ″Manifesto of the Ninety-Three″, which was an attempt by a sizable group of German artists and intellectuals to justify Germany's militarism and position during the First World War, one of its original signatories, Wilhelm Foerster, as well as dissenters Albert Einstein, Georg Friedrich Nicolai, and Otto Buek rebutted the Manifesto of the Ninety-Three's contents by supporting and signing the ″Manifesto to the Europeans″ instead. This document urged scholars and artists alike to support a common world culture (principally European) and to transcend "nationalistic passions". Although the document had been sent to numerous university professors, it did not find any other signatories beyond the four—Nicolai, Einstein, Buek, and Foerster—and in the end, was only published in an unauthorized form by a Swiss publisher in 1917. 

Being an author of the ″Manifesto to the Europeans″ proved detrimental to physician and medical professor Georg Friedrich Nicolai's career, who at the time was serving in Berlin as a medical officer. He was transferred out of his unit to a remote garrison, demoted in rank, and tasked to otherwise menial duties. By the time World War I came to a close, Nicolai had been imprisoned by the German state but made a dramatic escape to Denmark in a fragile Albatross aircraft. He became, along with the likes of French author Romain Rolland and British mathematician Bertrand Russell, one of the leading international proponents of pacifism. While eventually Nicolai was reinstated as a professor at the University of Berlin, militant right wing agitators routinely disrupted his lectures and threatened his students, so sometime in April 1922, Nicolai moved to Argentina and never resettled in Germany.

Text
A copy of the text was found amid Albert Einstein's writings. He captured its contents for posterity. It reads:

References

Notes

Citations

Bibliography
 
 
 

Cultural history of World War I
German Empire in World War I
Political manifestos
World War I publications
1914 documents